Tagokura Dam (田子倉ダム) is a gravity dam, on the Tadami River in the Fukushima Prefecture of Japan. It is owned and operated by the Electric Power Development Company (J-Power). The lake which it impounds is known as Lake Tagokura.

Construction of the dam started in 1953 and it was completed in 1959.

See also 
Tadami Dam – located downstream
Otori Dam – located upstream

References

Dams completed in 1959
Dams in Fukushima Prefecture
Dams on the Tadami River
Energy infrastructure completed in 1960
Gravity dams
Hydroelectric power stations in Japan
Reservoirs in Japan
1959 establishments in Japan